is a Japanese-Canadian artist.

Life and work
Matsubara graduated from the Kyoto University of Applied Arts in 1960. She then pursued an MFA in the School of Fine Arts at the Carnegie Mellon University in Pittsburgh on a Fulbright Travel Grant, and since then has traveled extensively and taught at the Pratt Institute in Brooklyn—a rare distinction for a Japanese woman. She also studied one year at the Royal College of Art, London. Currently she lives and works in Oakville, Canada.

Naoko Matsubara’s father was the chief priest in a Shinto shrine in Kyoto. Shrines and temples became one of the major themes of Matsubara’s works. Naoko Matsubara’s style is influenced by her teacher Munakata Shiko (1903–1975), who worked in the mingei (folk art) tradition. Her works are part of the collections of many museums around the world such as the Portland Art Museum, the Harvard Art Museums, the Fine Arts Museums of San Francisco, the Carnegie Museum of Art, the Detroit Institute of Art, the University of Michigan Museum of Art, the Sidney and Lois Eskenazi Museum of Art, the Pennsylvania Academy of Fine Arts, the Los Angeles County Museum of Art, the Albright-Knox Art Gallery, the Yale University Art Gallery, the Philadelphia Museum of Art, the Art Institute of Chicago, the Royal Ontario Museum, the Albertina in Vienna, the British Museum in London, the Kyoto National Museum of Modern Art, the Museum of Fine Arts, Boston, the Tokyo National Museum of Modern Art,  the Smithsonian Institution and the Library of Congress in Washington, the Hamburg Museum of Arts and Crafts, the Haifa Museum in Israel and the Art Gallery of New South Wales in Sydney. She was made a member of the Royal Canadian Academy of Arts.

Naoko Matsubara's sister is the novelist Hisako Matsubara, they collaborated  on the publication of Japanese tale Taketori Monogatari in German. Naoko did the illustrations, while her sister did the actual translation and the commentary.

Publications
 Matsubara, Naoko. Boston Impressions. Woodcuts by Naoko Matsubara. Text by Sinclair Hitchings. Barre Publications, 1970.
 Matsubara, Naoko. Kyoto Woodcuts. Tokyo, New York: Kodansha International; New York: Distributed in the United States by Kodansha International/USA, through Harper & Row, 1978.
 Matsubara, Naoko. In Praise of Trees. NY, London: Mosaic Press, 1985.
 Matsubara, Naoko. Tibetan Sky. Ontario: Bayeux Arts Inc., 1997.
 Matsubara, Naoko. Tales of Days Gone By. Tuttle Publishing, 2004.

See also
 Sōsaku hanga

References

Additional sources 
 "Images and biography" at Abbozzo Gallery web site
 Chika Okeke-Agulu, Postcolonial Modernism: Art and Decolonization in Twentieth-Century Nigeria (Duke University Press, 2015), p. 181.
 Helen Merritt, Nanako Yamada: Guide to Modern Japanese Woodblock Prints. 1900–1975. University of Hawaii Press, Honolulu HI 1995, p. 86
 Norman Tollman, Mary Tollman: Collecting Modern Japanese Prints: Then & Now. Tuttle Publishing, 2013, pp. 222-224

External links
 Biography and Gallery

1937 births
Living people
20th-century Japanese women artists
21st-century Japanese artists
21st-century Japanese women artists
People from Tokushima Prefecture
Sosaku hanga artists
Members of the Royal Canadian Academy of Arts
Japanese emigrants to Canada
Carnegie Mellon University alumni